Béla Maróti (born 7 May 1979 in Veszprém) is a Hungarian football player who currently plays for Lombard-Pápa TFC.

References 
Budapest Honved Official Website
HLSZ
EUFO

1979 births
Living people
People from Veszprém
Hungarian footballers
Association football midfielders
Veszprém LC footballers
Vasas SC players
Csepel SC footballers
Floridsdorfer AC players
FC Kärnten players
Kaposvári Rákóczi FC players
Budapest Honvéd FC players
Ferencvárosi TC footballers
Lombard-Pápa TFC footballers
Hungarian expatriate footballers
Expatriate footballers in Austria
Hungarian expatriate sportspeople in Austria
Sportspeople from Veszprém County